Benjamin Christian Zimmerman is an American pastor, former politician, retired United States Air Force pilot, and commercial pilot from Idaho. Zimmerman was a Republican member of Idaho House of Representatives.

Early life 
On April 14, 1940, Zimmerman was born in Shasi, Hubei Province, China. Zimmerman's parents were Lutheran missionaries in China. Zimmerman has a sister, Katharine.

Education 
Zimmerman attended Boise State University and Iowa State University. In 1980, Zimmerman earned a master of divinity degree from Concordia Seminary in Clayton, Missouri. In 1985, Zimmerman earned a degree from National Defense University.

Career 
In military, in 1959, Zimmerman served as an officer and a pilot in the US Air Force and Air National Guard and Reserve, until 1989. Zimmerman is a lieutenant colonel.

In 1968, Zimmerman became a commercial pilot for Trans World Airlines, until his retirement in May 1995.

In 1980, Zimmerman became a Lutheran minister, and is a pastor in Idaho.

On June 14, 1985, as a flight engineer of TWA Flight 847, his airplane was hijacked by Lebanese Shiite Muslims on a flight from Athens, Greece to Rome, Italy. The airplane eventually landed in Beirut. Zimmerman survived a beating at the hands of the hijackers. Eventually, the passengers and crew members were released. Zimmerman returned to Boise, Idaho, on July 4, 1985. In November 1985, Zimmerman became the author of Hostage in a Hostage World: Hope Aboard Hijacked TWA 847.

In May 1995, Zimmerman became a city council member of Cascade, Idaho, and became council president.

On November 5, 1996, Zimmerman won the election and became a Republican member of Idaho House of Representatives for District 8, seat A. Zimmerman defeated Gayle Wilde with 88.6% of the votes. On November 3, 1998, as an incumbent, Zimmerman won the election unopposed and continued serving District 8, seat A.

In April 2014, at age 74, Zimmerman became a pastor of Pilgrim Lutheran Church in Ontario.

Awards 
 1986 Silver Medillion award, presented by Boise State University

Personal life 
Zimmerman's wife is Melvia Kahale. They have three children. Zimmerman and his family live in Cascade, Idaho.

See also 
 Robert Stethem (United States Navy Seabee diver)
 Uli Derickson
 The Taking of Flight 847: The Uli Derickson Story (Ben Zimmerman)

References

External links 
 B. Christian Zimmerman at linkedin.com
 B. Christian Zimmerman at airandspace.si.edu
 Ben Christian Zimmerman at nytimes.com (July 4, 1985)
 Benjamin C. Zimmerman at latkmes.com (July 4, 1985)
 The Taking of Flight 847: The Uli Derickson Story (1988) at IMDb (Ben Zimmerman)
 Benjamin Zimmerman at washingtonpost.com (June 16, 1985)
 Benjamin Zimmerman image at historicimages.com
 Benjamin Christian Zimmerman Folder (select view all, restricted access)
 $353 million Judgement against Iran

1940 births
Living people
20th-century Lutheran clergy
Concordia Theological Seminary alumni
Hijacking survivors
Republican Party members of the Idaho House of Representatives
United States Air Force officers
American expatriates in China
Boise State University alumni
People from Jingzhou
Trans World Airlines people
Military personnel from Idaho
United States Air Force reservists